Well To Do (1963–1985) was a British-bred Thoroughbred racehorse who competed in National Hunt racing.

He is best known for winning the 1972 Grand National giving Tim Forster his first Grand National win of three.

He entered the National 14/1, a price which had dropped from 33/1 on confirmation that Graham Thorner would be his jockey.

Grand National record

References

1963 racehorse births
Racehorses bred in the United Kingdom
Racehorses trained in the United Kingdom
Grand National winners
1985 racehorse deaths